The Cook Ice Cap or Cook Glacier ( or Glacier Cook) is a large ice cap in the Kerguelen Islands in the French Southern Territories zone of the far Southern Indian Ocean.

Geography

Named after British explorer James Cook (1728–1779), on French navigational charts of the early 20th century this ice cap appears as 'Glacier Richthofen'

Glaciers
About sixty glaciers flow from the inner ice cap in a roughly radial pattern. At the feet of the snout of these outlet glaciers there are often terminal moraines with dammed lakes of varying sizes. Further down the glacial meltwaters have formed numerous outwash plains at certain, mostly inland, locations. Only one of the glaciers originating in the Cook Ice Cap has its terminus in the Indian Ocean at the Anse des Glaçons in southeastern Kerguelen's deeply indented coastline.

The following are the main glaciers listed clockwise:

 Agassiz Glacier  (Glacier Agassiz)
 Chamonix Glacier  (Glacier de Chamonix)
 Dumont d'Urville Glacier  (Glacier Dumont d'Urville)
 Vallot Glacier  (Glacier Vallot)
 Naumann Glacier  (Glacier Naumann)
 Explorateur Glacier  (Glacier de l'Explorateur)
 Ampère Glacier  (Glacier Ampère)
 La Diozaz Glacier  (Glacier de la Diozaz)
 Lavoisier Glacier  (Glacier Lavoisier)
 Descartes Glacier  (Glacier Descartes)
 Pierre Curie Glacier  (Glacier Pierre Curie)
 Pasteur Glacier  (Glacier Pasteur)
 Mariotte Glacier  (Glacier Mariotte)
 Cauchy Glacier  (Glacier Cauchy)

See also
List of glaciers

References

Ice caps
Glaciers of France
Landforms of the Kerguelen Islands
Subantarctic glaciers